Asoka Girihagama is the current Sri Lankan Ambassador to Canada. Prior to the appointment he was the Ambassador to Oman and a Director General for the Sri Lanka Overseas Service.

External links
 http://www.tops.lk/article28535-seva-vanitha-unit-donates-rs-1-m.html
 http://www.sundaytimes.lk/110306/News/nws_21.html
 http://www.tamilwritersguild.com/itrolondon.htm

Living people
Sri Lankan Buddhists
Alumni of the University of Jaffna
Alumni of the University of Colombo
Sinhalese civil servants
1958 births
Ambassadors of Sri Lanka to Oman